David Ben-Gurion (1886–1973) was the first Prime Minister of Israel.

Ben Gurion may also refer to:

People with the surname
 Nicodemus ben Gurion, a Biblical figure and wealthy Jew who lived in Jerusalem
 Joseph ben Gurion, a key leader during the first First Jewish–Roman War
 Paula Ben-Gurion (1892–1968), Russian-born wife of David Ben-Gurion

Municipalities
 Ramot Ben Gurion, a neighborhood in the city of Haifa, Israel

Places
 Ben Gurion Airport railway station, a station on the Israel Railways lines between Tel Aviv and Modi'in
 Ben Gurion Airport, the largest international airport in Israel
 Ben-Gurion International Airport Garden, a garden outside Terminal 3 of Ben Gurion International Airport
 Ben Gurion High School, a high school in Petah Tikva, Israel
 Ben-Gurion House, an historic house museum in Tel Aviv, Israel
 Ben-Gurion National Solar Energy Center, the national alternative energy research institute of Israel
 Ben-Gurion University of the Negev, a university in Israel with the main campus located in Beersheba
 Kiryat Ben-Gurion, a complex of government buildings in the Givat Ram neighborhood of Jerusalem, Israel
 Midreshet Ben-Gurion, an educational center and boarding school in Sde Boker in the Negev, Israel

See also 
Gurion
 Gorion, name variant

 Gurion Hyman (1925–2017), Jewish Canadian anthropologist, linguist, pharmacist, composer, artist, and translator

Hebrew-language surnames
Surnames of Israeli origin